The Mercedes-Benz Vision EQXX is a battery electric vehicle concept car by German carmaker Mercedes-Benz. Unveiled at the 2022 edition of the Consumer Electronics Show, the EQXX is a proof of concept, with Mercedes-Benz' primary goal being a target of below 10 kWh per 100 km (alternatively, greater than 10 km per kWh) in real life conditions. The interior of the EQXX also features various eco-friendly materials, such as faux leather manufactured from cacti and mushrooms. The car's name refers to Mercedes' vision for the future of automobile manufacturing, with Mercedes chairman Ola Källenius stating that the EQXX is "how we imagine the future of electric cars", and that the EQXX "underlines where our entire company is headed."

Background
Mercedes' entrance into the battery electric vehicle market began in 2016, with the introduction of the EQ concept car at the 2016 Paris Motor Show, where several other electric cars such as the Volkswagen ID. and Renault Zoe also made their debut. The EQ concept eventually went into production at the end of 2019, and like its later EQA and EQB siblings it was constructed on a platform designed for internal combustion engines, rather than a battery electric vehicle.

In October 2020, Mercedes introduced two dedicated electric vehicle platforms as part of a weekly strategy meeting–the Electric Vehicle Architecture (EVA), and the Mercedes-Benz Modular Architecture (MMA). The former platform is aimed towards larger vehicles such as full-size saloons and SUVs, with the latter aimed towards smaller vehicles such as compact cars. The structure of EQXX is said to incorporate several aspects of the upcoming MMA architecture, although it sits on its own bespoke rear-wheel drive platform. 

The first teaser of the EQXX was revealed at the end of November 2021. Mercedes-Benz Chief Operating Officer Markus Schäfer also announced alongside the teaser the reveal date of the EQXX, which was to be 5 January 2022 at the Consumer Electronics Show. However, the car digitally debuted two days earlier on January 3.

Overview
Initial design on the EQXX began in January 2021, with Mercedes selecting a team of specialised engineers from various departments that would also collaborate with Mercedes' Formula One engine manufacturing subsidiary, Mercedes AMG High Performance Powertrains. The latter had a significant role in the design of the EQXX's powertrain and packaging of the battery pack, incorporating their Formula One expertise. The primary design goals for the EQXX were weight reduction and aerodynamic efficiency, both of which would work in conjunction to give the EQXX  of range. Various smart features are on the interior of the EQXX to further reduce accessory power consumption. Mercedes has also partnered with several external companies for the technology present in the EQXX.

Battery and powertrain
The EQXX's lithium-ion battery pack and drivetrain were largely developed in partnership with Mercedes AMG High Performance Powertrains. Several changes were made to optimise the powertrain, starting off with redesigning the inverter, now incorporating Onsemi's silicon carbide anodes, along with the engine control unit being almost identical to the one utilised in the Mercedes-AMG ONE. In order to increase energy density, Mercedes also introduced a new method of packing the individual cells in the battery pack called cell-to-pack. Cell-to-pack creates tighter packaging because the cells themselves are not separated into modules, but instead are directly placed into the battery pack itself without any sort of physical partition. A sugar cane-carbon fibre composite forms the lid of the 'OneBox', a structure which compartmentalises the electrical components, and is said to weigh . The cell-to-pack method of packaging is often found in Formula One, including Mercedes' own cars. Mercedes worked together with their suppliers to reduce the battery pack's weight by 30%, reduce the size by half compared to a contemporary Mercedes-Benz EQS, and increase cell energy density by 20%. Lightweight brake discs fashioned from aluminium possess regenerative braking capabilities to further extend the EQXX's range.

A single-speed direct-drive transmission transfers power from the battery pack to the radial flux motor situated at the rear axle, which produces . A cooling plate situated below the car provides a passive method of heat transfer, with shutters that can be adjusted to control airflow. A radiator is still present should there be a need for extreme heat or intense climate control. The EQXX also uses a 900-volt architecture, which allows for a lower electric current. A lower current reduces Joule heating caused by copper loss, despite the EQXX's relatively thinner cabling. As a result of the powertrain optimisations, the EQXX is said to have parasitic loss of only 5%, i.e. 95% of the energy from the battery is transferred to the wheels, with 5% lost during the energy transfer to things such as the gearbox.  

The EQXX also has DC fast charging, with Mercedes claiming the ability to add  of range within 15 minutes. Despite this capability, the charging port was sealed during the EQXX's long-range demonstration runs to prevent tampering.

Interior
The EQXX features neuromorphic computer systems designed in partnership with Australian firm BrainChip, which help to drastically reduce the power consumption of interior components such as the infotainment system. The EQXX's neuromorphic computer systems run spiking neural networks, which simulate the structure of natural neural networks and assist features such as the voice user interface. A  8K resolution screen spanning the entire front dashboard contains the controls for the infotainment, along with other information about car vitals. The interior features various eco-friendly materials, the carpet is woven from bamboo fibres, and the seats are adorned with faux leather made from mycelium. Instead of door handles, the EQXX features straps to open the doors that are fashioned from a vegan silk material produced in collaboration with German textile firm AMSilk. A cactus fibre-based material also upholsters the seats.

Exterior

Another area where Mercedes extracted significantly more range was the refinement of the EQXX's aerodynamic profile. The rear features Kammback styling, and has an axle track  narrower than the front, in order to create the ideal "teardrop" shape. The teardrop shape, first popularised in 1937 by Talbot-Lago, is considered to be the ideal shape for an automobile to have the least amount of aerodynamic drag. Whilst the EQXX does not strictly adhere to a teardrop shape, the Kammback styling, flush rear wheels, and narrower rear axle track contribute greatly to lowering its drag coefficient, which is the lowest of any battery electric vehicle at 0.17. The EQXX also has semi-transparent wheel covers, which have miniature vents that help reduce turbulence surrounding the wheel wells. A lightweight forged magnesium rim construction helps to reduce the rolling resistance of the bespoke Bridgestone 185/65 R20 tyres, which themselves have been designed specifically with the goal of reducing rolling resistance.

The EQXX also has wing mirrors, instead of using cameras like the ones found in the Honda e, although the mirrors are said to be much more aerodynamic than regular wing mirrors. The decision to retain wing mirrors was made on the basis that an electronic camera system would draw too much power and negatively affect the range of the car. 117 solar panels developed in partnership with the Fraunhofer Institute for Solar Energy Systems adorn the roof of the EQXX, which power the ancillary systems such as the infotainment system, and are connected to a lithium iron phosphate battery separate from the main lithium-ion battery.

The front of the EQXX resembles a sports car, with a low-slung hood and distinguished fenders. LEDs and a full light bar provide illumination, and instead of the traditional Mercedes-Benz star hood ornament, the star is incorporated into the front bumper as a sticker. As with the rear wheels, the front wheels sit completely flush with the bodywork. In order to further reduce weight, the EQXX's body in white was constructed from a blend of high-tensile steel and steel recycled from scrap. Fibreglass and carbon fibre doors reinforced with aluminium help keep passengers safe in the event of a side collision.

In production vehicles
Although the EQXX itself remains as a one-off concept, several of the EQXX's features such as powertrain components and other smart features will feature in production models, the first of which is set to be the upcoming electrified version of the 2024 Mercedes-Benz C-Class.

References

Mercedes-Benz concept vehicles
Cars introduced in 2022
Battery electric vehicles